Princeton Cemetery is located in Princeton, New Jersey, United States. It is owned by the Nassau Presbyterian Church. In his 1878 history of Princeton, New Jersey, John F. Hageman refers to the cemetery as "The Westminster Abbey of the United States."

Notable burials

 Archibald Alexander (1772–1851), Presbyterian theologian
 James Waddel Alexander (1804–1859), Presbyterian theologian and eldest son of Archibald Alexander
 Joseph Addison Alexander (1809–1860), Presbyterian biblical scholar and third son of Archibald Alexander
 William Cowper Alexander (1806–1874), politician, businessman and second son of Archibald Alexander
 Frank Anscombe (1918–2001), statistician, known for Anscombe's quartet
 John N. Bahcall (1934–2005), astrophysicist
 George Wildman Ball (1909–1994), diplomat
 George Dashiell Bayard (1835–1862), Civil War general
 Sylvia Beach (1887–1962), bookshop owner
 Harold H. Bender (1882–1951), philologist
 John Berrien (1711–1772), New Jersey Supreme Court Justice and owner of Rockingham, Washington's headquarters
 William G. Bowen, (1933–2016), president of Princeton University
 Aaron Burr (1756–1836), controversial Revolutionary War hero and politician, third vice president of the United States, killer of Alexander Hamilton, adventurer who was eventually tried and acquitted of treason
 Aaron Burr Sr. (1716–1757), Presbyterian minister, second president of Princeton University and father of Aaron Burr
 Brendan Byrne (1924–2018), 47th governor of New Jersey
 Alonzo Church (1903–1995), mathematician
 Grover Cleveland (1837–1908), 22nd and 24th president of the United States
 Frances Folsom Cleveland Preston (1864–1947), wife of Grover Cleveland and First Lady of the United States
 Ruth Cleveland (1891–1904), first child of Grover and Frances Cleveland and supposed name sake of the Baby Ruth candy bar
 Edward Samuel Corwin (1878–1963), author and professor of law
 Samuel Davies (1723–1761), president of Princeton University
 Erling Dorf (1905–1984), Renowned paleobotanist, professor of Geology at Princeton University
 Jonathan Edwards (1703–1758), president of Princeton University and Calvinist theologian
 Richard Stockton Field (1803–1870), US senator and New Jersey Attorney General
 John Huston Finley (1863–1940), author, president of Knox College and University of the State of New York
 Donald B. Fullerton (1892–1985), missionary and founder of the Princeton Christian Fellowship
 Harold Furth (1930–2002), physicist
 George Horace Gallup (1901–1984), pollster
 William Francis Gibbs (1886–1967), naval architect
 Kurt Gödel (1906–1978), mathematician
 Michael Graves (1934–2015), architect and product designer
 Peter Charles Harris (1865–1951), adjutant general of the U.S. Army
 Charles Hodge (1797–1878), Calvinist theologian
 David Hunter (1802–1886), Civil War General
 Louis "Lajos" Jambor (1884–1954), Hungarian-born American painter, illustrator and muralist.
 William Hallock Johnson (1865–1963), president of Lincoln University in Pennsylvania
 Joseph Kargé (1823–1892), Civil War General and Princeton University professor
 George Frost Kennan (1904–2005), diplomat
 Alan Krueger (1960–2019), economist
 Frank Lewin (1925–2008), composer
 David Kellogg Lewis (1941–2001), philosopher
 Edward Parke Custis Lewis (1837–1892), diplomat
 John Maclean Jr. (1800–1886), president of Princeton University
 Jose Menendez (1944–1989) and Mary Louise (Kitty) Menendez (1941–1989), murder victims of their sons, Lyle and Erik Menendez
 John O'Hara (1905–1970), author of Appointment in Samarra, BUtterfield 8, and many short stories
 Moses Taylor Pyne (1855–1921), financier, philanthropist and owner of Drumthwacket Estate
 Roger Atkinson Pryor (1828–1919), Special US Minister to Greece, US congressman from Virginia, Confederate congressman and general, journalist, New York Supreme Court justice
 William Drew Robeson (1844–1918), father of singer, actor and activist Paul Robeson
 Henry Norris Russell (1877–1957), astronomer
 William Milligan Sloane (1850–1928), first US Olympic Committee president
 Howard Alexander Smith (1880–1966), US senator from New Jersey
 John P. Stockton (1826–1900), New Jersey attorney general and U.S. senator
 Richard Stockton (1764–1828), U.S. senator from New Jersey
 Robert Field Stockton (1795–1866), naval officer
 Lyman Spitzer (1914–1997), astronomer
 John Renshaw Thomson (1800–1862), U.S. senator from New Jersey
 William G. Thompson (1840–1904), mayor of Detroit
 Augustus Trowbridge (1870–1934), professor and dean at Princeton University
 John W. Tukey (1915–2000), statistician
 Paul Tulane (1801–1887), Tulane University benefactor
 John von Neumann (1903–1957), mathematician
 Benjamin Breckinridge Warfield (1851–1921), Presbyterian theologian
 Canvass White (1790–1834), engineer and inventor
 Eugene Paul Wigner (1902–1995), Nobel Prize-winning physicist
 John Witherspoon (1723–1794), signer of the Declaration of Independence
 William Willet (1867–1921), portraitist and stained glass designer
 Charles J. Lu (1969–2000), famous brother of Phi Kappa Tau, Delta Psi Chapter

Gallery

References

External links 

 Nassau Presbyterian Church: Princeton Cemetery
 Princeton Online: Princeton Cemetery
 A photographic tour through Princeton Cemetery

Cemeteries in Mercer County, New Jersey
Princeton, New Jersey
Protestant Reformed cemeteries
1757 establishments in New Jersey
Historic district contributing properties in Mercer County, New Jersey
Tombs of presidents of the United States